Viriato Alberto Fiallo Rodríguez (28 October 1895 – 4 October 1983) was a Dominican physician and politician.

Life 
Viriato Fiallo was the son of Alberto Fiallo Cabral and Ramona Rodríguez Germes (daughter of Fidel Rodríguez Urdaneta, a member of the junta that came to power in 1876). In 1920 he married his cousin Prudencia Fiallo Lluberes (daughter of his uncle, the poet Fabio Fiallo Cabral), with whom he had two children: Fabio Alberto & Rafael Arístides Fiallo Fiallo. He was a cousin of the fashion designer Óscar de la Renta Fiallo.

Viriato Fiallo emerged as a great leader in the fall of tyranny when he played the anti-Trujillo feelings and was exalted by their struggles and pristine behavior. Before, he had been known superficially. He had been a physician in the mills of the Vicini family and had chaired the Dominican-German Committee.

Fiallo was jailed several times for being an outspoken opponent of the regime of Trujillo, following the death of dictator he founded the National Civic Union (UCN), as a nonpartisan movement whose main objective movement was the oust of the Trujillo family and their associates, converting later the UCN movement into a political party with a view to the presidential elections of 1962. He participates as a candidate for the Presidency of the Republic, in a campaign without precedent in the country in which the masses of the country turned to political activism.

1895 births
1983 deaths
Dominican Republic people of Canarian descent
Dominican Republic people of Portuguese descent
Dominican Republic medical doctors
Dominican Republic politicians
Dominican Republic prisoners and detainees
People from Azua Province
Candidates for President of the Dominican Republic
20th-century physicians
White Dominicans